Myriopteris viscida, formerly known as Cheilanthes viscida, is a species of lip fern known by the common names viscid lip fern and viscid lace fern.

It is an uncommon member of the flora in rocky areas of the higher Mojave Desert mountains, and in the ecotone of the Peninsular Ranges and the Colorado Desert. Its distribution extends into northern Baja California.

Description
This fern produces frilly leaves up to about 30 centimeters long, each divided into segments which are subdivided, the ultimate segments just a few millimeters long and widely lance-shaped to oblong. The leaf segments bear resin glands which exude a very sticky, clear fluid.

The leaves are also somewhat hairy. The leaf segments have curled edges along which are located the sori with their brown sporangia.

References

External links
Calflora Database: Myriopteris viscida (viscid lip fern, viscid lipfern) — (formerly Cheilanthes viscida).
Jepson Manual eFlora (TJM2) treatment of Myriopteris viscida — (formerly Cheilanthes viscida).
USDA Plants Profile for Cheilanthes viscida
Flora of North America
UC Photos gallery — Cheilanthes viscida

viscida
Ferns of California
Ferns of Mexico
Flora of the California desert regions
Flora of Baja California
Flora of the Sonoran Deserts
Natural history of the Colorado Desert
Natural history of the Mojave Desert
Natural history of the Peninsular Ranges